David A. Wilson (1875 – ?) was an English footballer who played as an inside forward in the Football League for Liverpool (from 1899 to 1900) and in Scottish football for Airdrieonians, Hamilton Academical and Albion Rovers.

References

1875 births
Place of birth missing
Year of death missing
Place of death missing
English footballers
Association football inside forwards
Liverpool F.C. players
Airdrieonians F.C. (1878) players
Hamilton Academical F.C. players
Albion Rovers F.C. players
English Football League players
Scottish Football League players